Among alternative tunings for the guitar, an open G tuning is an open tuning that features the G-major chord; its open notes are selected from the notes of a G-major chord, such as the G-major triad (G,B,D). For example, a popular open-G tuning is
D–G–D–G–B–D (low to high).

An open-G tuning allows a G-major chord to be strummed on all six strings with neither fretting of the left hand nor a capo. Like other open tunings, it allows the eleven major chords besides G major each to be strummed by barring at most one finger on exactly one fret. Open tunings are common in blues and folk music, and they are used in the playing of slide and bottleneck guitars.

Repetitive open-G tunings are used by Russian guitars, Dobro guitars, and banjos. They repeat three open-string notes.

The repetitive open-G tuning
D–G–B–D–G–B–D

is used by the Russian guitar, which has seven strings tuned mostly in triads, in contrast to other guitars, which are tuned mostly in fourths.

Dobros use a full six-string tuning with a bottom G: G–B–D–G–B–D, low to high. The two lowest strings are, accordingly, tuned three semitones higher for the lowest string (from E up to G) and two semitones higher for the second-lowest string (from A up to B) while the highest string is tuned two semitones lower (from E down to D), relative to standard tuning.

Five-string banjo's standard tuning is also an Open G: g–D–G–B–D, where the lower case "g" denotes the highest-pitched "drone string", physically located next to (above) the lowest-pitched string, the first upper case "D".

Overtones of the fundamental note G

Bad Company guitarist Mick Ralphs has used another open-G tuning, which listed the initial six overtones of the G note,
G–G–D–G–B–D
 for "Hey Hey" and while writing the demo of "Can't Get Enough".
The overtones tuning G–G–D–G–B–D was used by Joni Mitchell for "Electricity", "For the Roses", and "Hunter (The Good Samaritan)". Truncating this tuning to G-D-G-B-D for his five-string guitar, Keith Richards plays this overtones-tuning on The Rolling Stones' "Honky Tonk Women", "Brown Sugar" and "Start Me Up". American rock band Eagles of Death Metal, uses this tuning for the majority of their songs.

See also

 Minor thirds tuning
 Scordatura, alternative tunings of stringed instruments
 Stringed instrument tunings

Notes

References

 
  PDF

Further reading
 

Open tunings
Repetitive guitar-tunings